Inés Efron (born May 9, 1984 in Mexico City) is an Argentine actress.

Career 
Before XXY, Inés Efron starred in Glue, a drama about three teenagers set in a small town in a remote town in Uruguay. In her XXY role, Efron's character is a 15-year-old intersex person trying to make a decision about their identity. Efron pointed out that "I liked the Alex character a lot and thought: I can do that. I felt a real connection." For her performance, Efron won the award for Best Actress at the Cartagena Film Festival as well as three other awards. Efron is cited by Internet portal Ciudad.com.ar as "one of the most interesting arising actresses of Buenos Aires." In 2008, she starred in The Headless Woman by Lucrecia Martel; and in 2009 she starred in another one of Lucía Puenzo‘s films, called The Fish Child. She also worked in theater with Lola Arias in the works  Poses para dormir, Sueño con revólver, Temporariamente agotado and Demo of Ignacio Sánchez Mestre.

Films

Awards and nominations

References

External links
 Inés Efron at Alternativa Teatral
 Entrevista con Inés Efrón (Español) 
 

1985 births
Jewish Argentine actresses
Argentine film actresses
Mexican emigrants to Argentina
Living people